Darby Island Airport is a private use airport located near Darby Island, the Bahamas.

See also
List of airports in the Bahamas

References

External links 
 Island Airport record for Darby Island Airport at Landings.com

Airports in the Bahamas